The 2013 Pac-12 Conference football season began on August 29, 2013 with USC at Hawaii. The conference's first game was played on September 7, 2013 with Washington State winning over USC, and the final game was the Pac-12 Championship Game on December 7, 2013. This is the third season for the conference as a 12-team league. The Sagarin Ratings had the Pac-12 as the best conference in the nation top to bottom in the final rating of the season.

Previous season

The Second Pac-12 Championship Game was held on Friday, November 20, 2012. Stanford, the North Division Champions, defeated UCLA, the South Division Champions, to claim their thirteenth conference title.

The Stanford Cardinal ended the regular season with an 11–2 record which earned the team a berth in the Rose Bowl, where they defeated Wisconsin for their first Rose Bowl win since 1972. Oregon won eleven games and lost to Stanford and earned an at-large BCS berth. The Ducks defeated the Big 12 co-champion Kansas State in the Fiesta Bowl. Arizona beat Nevada and Arizona State beat Navy while Washington was defeated by Boise State, UCLA was defeated by Baylor, Oregon State was defeated by Texas, and USC was defeated by Georgia Tech in non-BCS bowls.  The Pac-12 went 4–4 in all bowls, with a 2–0 mark in BCS bowls and 2–4 in non-BCS bowls.

Preseason
2013 Pac-12 Spring Football:

North Division 	
 California – Mon., Feb 25 to Sat., March 23
 Oregon – Tue., April 2 to Sat., April 27
 Oregon State – Mon., March 13 to Fri., April 26
 Stanford – Mon., Feb. 25 to Sat., April 13
 Washington – Tue., April 2 to Sat., April 20
 Washington State – Thu., March 21 to Sat., April 20

South Division 	
 Arizona –  Mon., March 4 to Sat., April 13
 Arizona State – Tue., March 19 to Thu., April 18
 Colorado – Thu., March 7 to Tue., April 16
 UCLA – Tue., April 2 to Sat., April 27
 USC – Tue., March 5 to Sat., April 13	
 Utah – Tue., March 19 to Sat., April 20

 July 26, 2013 – 2013 Media Day was held at Sony Pictures Studios, Culver City, California
 August 1, 2013 – Washington State started the Pac-12 pre-season practices

Head coaches

 
 Rich Rodriguez, Arizona – 2nd year
 Todd Graham, Arizona State – 2nd year
 Sonny Dykes, California – 1st year
 Mike MacIntyre, Colorado – 1st year
 Mark Helfrich, Oregon – 1st year
 Mike Riley, Oregon State – 12th year

 David Shaw, Stanford – 3rd year
 Jim L. Mora, UCLA – 2nd year
 Lane Kiffin, USC – 4th year, Ed Orgeron – Interim
 Kyle Whittingham, Utah – 9th year
 Steve Sarkisian, Washington – 5th year
 Mike Leach, Washington State – 2nd year

Rankings

Schedule

Week 1

Week 2

Week 3

Week 4

Week 5

Week 6

Week 7

Week 8

Week 9

Week 10

Week 11

Week 12

Week 13

Week 14

Week 15 (Pac-12 Championship Game)

Bowl games

Pac-12 vs. BCS matchups

Players of the week

Following each week's games, Pac-12 conference officials select the players of the week from the conference's teams.

Position key

Home game attendance

Sellout
 Game played at CenturyLink Field in Seattle.
 Pac-12 Championship Game

Awards and honors
Doak Walker Award

Maxwell Award

Walter Camp Player of the Year Award

Pac-12 Morris Trophy (top lineman)
 Xavier Su'a-Filo, UCLA; Will Sutton, ASU

All-Americans
Academic All-America Team Member of the Year (CoSIDA)

AFCA Coaches' All-Americans First Team:

All-Pac-12 teams

Offensive Player of the Year: Ka'Deem Carey, RB, Arizona
Pat Tillman Defensive Player of the Year: Will Sutton, DE, Arizona State
Offensive Freshman of the Year: Myles Jack, RB, UCLA
Defensive Freshman of the Year: Myles Jack, LB, UCLA
Coach of the Year: Todd Graham, Arizona State

Offense:

Defense:

Specialists:

All-Academic
First team

Drafted Players
2014 NFL Draft

Notes
 March 4, 2013 – Oregon State introduced a new logo and uniforms

References